Colonel John West, Jr. of West Point, Virginia (1632–1691) was a planter, commander of the New Kent Militia in the Colony of Virginia, and represented the county in the House of Burgesses, as would his sons.

Early and family life
John West was born on June 6, 1632 at Bellfield Plantation, York River, Virginia.  He was the child of Captain John West, Virginia Governor and his wife Anne Percy, daughter of George Percy and Anne Floyd. His father received an extra land grant because John was the first child of English parents born in the York River area.

Career

West farmed using enslaved labor. In 1659, West's father died, the last of the four sons of Thomas West, 2nd Baron De La Warr who came to Virginia.  In recognition of the family's contributions to the colonial enterprise, the Virginia Assembly passed the following Act:

John West also served in the militia from 1652 to 1673, ending with the rank of lieutenant colonel. He supported Governor Berkeley during Bacon's Rebellion in 1676, during which rebels imprisoned him and damaged his property. After its suppression, West also served as a member of the courts-martials which tried captured rebels. However, the rebellion caused an official investigation and the report of the Commissioners noted:

Beginning in 1680 until his death in 1691 West represented New Kent County (part-time) in the House of Burgesses.

Family
By 1664, West married Unity Croshaw, daughter of Major Joseph Croshaw of York, member of the House of Burgesses. The children of Colonel John and Unity Croshaw were:

John West III; married Judith Armistead.
Nathaniel West, married, as her second husband, Martha Woodard, widow of Gideon Macon and grandmother of Martha Washington.
Anne West; married Henry Fox.
Captain Thomas Oliphant West (1670 West Point, VA – 23 December 1740, New Kent, VA); married Agnes Frances Estes Burton (1670–1720). They had five children: Nathaniel (1692–1727), Col. Francis (1702–1786), Virginia Agnes West (1705–1750; married Richard Thomas Gregory (1713–1742)), Anne (1714–1780), and Thomas (1718–1808).

West was said to have fathered a son with the Pamunkey leader Cockacoeske about 1656, several years before West's marriage to Unity Croshaw. The child became known as Captain John West.  Although there is evidence that Col. West was living apart from his wife in 1685, the year before Cockacoeske's death, the reasons for their separation remain unknown.

Death and legacy
West died in 1691, because records show his will dated November 15, 1689, was probated in that year. However, a courthouse fire in 1787 destroyed most county records, including that will. All three of his sons would become major landowners and serve in the House of Burgesses.

Ancestry

References

Sources
 "The Powhatan Indians of Virginia: Their Traditional Culture. Rountree, Helen C., University of Oklahoma Press, 1989.
 "Cockacoeske, Queen of Pamunkey: Diplomat and Suzeraine." W. Martha W. McCartney.
 "Powhatan's Mantle: Indians in the Colonial Southeast by Peter H. Wood.
 "A General and Heraldic Dictionary of the Peerage and Baronetage of the British Empire" by John Burke, Esq. Fourth Edition. In Two Volumes. VOL. I. London: Henry Colburn and Richard Bentley, New Burlington Street. 1834. Delaware, Earl Pg. 333-335 (pdf pg. 373-375)

Notes on the ancestral pedigree of the West family:
https://play.google.com/books/reader?printsec=frontcover&output=reader&id=Cq8KAAAAYAAJ&pg=GBS.PA333

 "A General and Heraldic Dictionary of the Peerage and Baronetage of the British Empire" by John Burke, Esq. Fourth Edition. In Two Volumes. VOL.I. London: Henry Colburn and Richard Bentley, New Burlington Street. 1834. House of La Warr. Pg. 335-336. (pdf pg. 375-376)

Notes on the ancestral pedigree of the La Warr family:
https://play.google.com/books/reader?printsec=frontcover&output=reader&id=Cq8KAAAAYAAJ&pg=GBS.PA333

1632 births
1691 deaths
Virginia colonial people
John West II
People from West Point, Virginia

de:Bacon's Rebellion